John Donnelly (born 4 March 1998) is an Irish hurler who plays for Kilkenny Intermediate Championship club Thomastown and at inter-county level with the Kilkenny senior hurling team. He usually lines out as a centre-forward.

Playing career

DCU Dóchas Éireann

As a student at Dublin City University, Donnelly immediately became involved in hurling and joined the college's freshers' hurling team in his first year. On 2 March 2017, he was selected at full-forward when Dublin City University faced the University of Limerick in the All-Ireland freshers' final. Donnelly was held scoreless but ended the game with a winners' medal following the 1-15 to 1-13 extra-time victory.

Thomastown

Donnelly joined the Thomastown club at a young age and played in all grades at juvenile and underage levels before eventually joining the club's top adult team in the Kilkenny Intermediate Championship.

Kilkenny

Minor and under-21

Donnelly first lined out for Kilkenny as a member of the minor team during the 2015 Leinster Championship. He made his first appearance for the team on 25 April 2015 when he scored two points from play in a 1-18 to 1-17 extra-time defeat of Wexford. On 5 July 2015, Donnelly won a Leinster Championship medal after scoring two points from play in a 1-17 to 1-15 defeat of Dublin in the final.

Donnelly was eligible for the minor grade for a second consecutive year in 2016. He made his last appearance for the team on 14 May 2016 in a 2-18 to 1-19 defeat by Dublin.

Donnelly progressed onto the Kilkenny under-21 for the 2017 Leinster Championship. He made his first appearance for the team on 31 May 2017 when he lined out in a 0-21 to 0-16 defeat of Dublin. Donnelly won a Leinster Championship medal on 5 July 2017 after scoring two points from play in Kilkenny's 0-30 to 1-15 defeat of Wexford in the final. On 9 September 2017, he scored a point from centre-forward when Kilkenny suffered a 0-17 to 0-11 defeat by Limerick in the All-Ireland final.

Donnelly was eligible for the under-21 grade for a second consecutive year in 2018. He made his last appearance for the team on 20 June 2018 in a 3-13 to 1-17 defeat by Galway.

Senior

Donnelly joined the Kilkenny senior team at the start of the 2017 season. He was an unused substitute throughout the National League, Leinster Championship and All-Ireland Championship campaigns.

On 27 January 2018, Donnelly made his first appearance for the Kilkenny senior team. He was introduced as a 43rd-minute substitute for Conor Martin in a 1-24 to 0-24 defeat by Cork in the National League. On 8 April 2018, Donnelly was selected at left wing-forward when Kilkenny faced Tipperary in the National League final. He scored two points from play and collected a winners' medal following the 2-23 to 2-17 victory. Donnelly was selected on the bench when Kilkenny faced Galway in the Leinster final on 1 July 2018. He was introduced as a substitute for Richie Leahy in the 0-18 apiece draw. Donnelly broke onto the starting fifteen at right wing-forward for the replay a week later, however, he was substituted by Luke Scanlon in the 1-28 to 3-15 defeat.

On 30 June 2019, Donnelly was listed amongst the substitutes when Kilkenny faced Wexford in the Leinster final. He remained on the bench for the entire game which Kilkenny lost by 1-23 to 0-23.

Career statistics

Honours

DCU Dóchas Éireann
All-Ireland Freshers' Hurling Championship: 2017

Kilkenny
Leinster Senior  Hurling Championship: 2020, 2021
National Hurling League: 2018
Leinster Under-21 Hurling Championship: 2017
Leinster Minor Hurling Championship: 2015

References

1998 births
Living people
Thomastown hurlers
Kilkenny inter-county hurlers
DCU hurlers